Buddleja davidii (spelling variant Buddleia davidii), also called summer lilac, butterfly-bush, or orange eye, is a species of flowering plant in the family Scrophulariaceae, native to Sichuan and Hubei provinces in central China, and also Japan. It is widely used as an ornamental plant, and many named varieties are in cultivation. The genus was named Buddleja after Reverend Adam Buddle, an English botanist. The species name davidii honors the French missionary and explorer in China, Father Armand David, who was the first European to report the shrub. It was found near Ichang by Dr Augustine Henry about 1887 and sent to St Petersburg.  Another botanist-missionary in China, Jean-André Soulié, sent seed to the French nursery Vilmorin, and B. davidii entered commerce in the 1890s.

B. davidii was accorded the RHS Award of Merit (AM) in 1898, and the Award of Garden Merit (AGM) in 1941.

Description
The pale brown bark becomes deeply fissured with age. The branches are quadrangular in section, the younger shoots covered in a dense indumentum. Flowers are perfect (having both male and female parts), hence are hermaphrodite rather than monoecious (separate male and female flowers on the same plant) as is often incorrectly stated. Ploidy 2n = 76 (tetraploid).

Buddleja davidii, after Leeuwenberg
In his 1979 revision of the taxonomy of the African and Asiatic species of Buddleja, the Dutch botanist Anthonius Leeuwenberg sank the six varieties of the species as synonyms of the type, considering them to be within the natural variation of a species, and unworthy of varietal recognition. It was Leeuwenberg's taxonomy which was adopted in the Flora of China published in 1996. However, as the distinctions of the former varieties are still widely recognized in horticulture, they are treated separately here:

Cultivation
Buddleja davidii cultivars are much appreciated worldwide as ornamentals and for the value of their flowers as a nectar source for many species of butterfly. However, the plant does not provide food for butterfly larvae, and buddlejas might out-compete the host plants that caterpillars require.

Younger wood is more floriferous, so even if frosts do not kill the previous year's growth, the shrub is usually hard-pruned in spring once frosts have finished, to encourage new growth. The removal of spent flower panicles may be undertaken to reduce the nuisance of self-seeding and encourage further flower production; this extends the flowering season which is otherwise limited to about six weeks, although the flowers of the second and third flushes are invariably smaller.

Hardiness: USDA zones 5–9.

There are approximately 180 davidii cultivars, as well as numerous hybrids with B. globosa and B. fallowiana grown in gardens.

A plant-evaluation manager at the Chicago Botanic Garden in Glencoe, Illinois (USDA Hardiness zone 5b) rated nearly 50 Buddlejia varieties and cultivars during a six-year trial period, summarizing in 2015 the characteristics of each and the study's findings. University studies have suggested that nectaring butterflies have greater preferences for some Buddleja cultivators than for others, with Lo & Behold 'Blue Chip' and 'Pink Delight' heading a list of eleven. 

Other notable cultivars and hybrids include 'Golden Glow' and 'Silver Frost'.

Invasive species

Buddleja davidii has been designated as an invasive species or a "noxious weed" in a number of countries in temperate regions, including the United Kingdom, the Republic of Ireland and New Zealand. It is naturalized in Australia and in many cities of central and southern Europe, where it can spread on open lands and in gardens. 

B. davidii was first documented as an invasive species in the United Kingdom during 1922. It is now often seen there along railway lines and on the sites of derelict factories and other buildings. The plant frequently grew on urban bomb sites during the aftermath of World War II, earning it the nickname of "the bomb site plant".

B. davidii is widely marketed throughout the United States, where it has reportedly become invasive in some, but not all, areas within which it has been planted. Although its flowers feed many native butterflies and other pollinators, plantings of the species are now controversial. To prevent seeding and to promote further flowering, its blossoms need to be removed ("deadheaded") as soon as they are spent. 

A number of Buddleja cultivars have become available that have a variety of sizes and blossom colors and that are either sterile or produce less than 2% viable seed. The northwestern U.S. state of Oregon, which designated B. davidii as a "noxious weed" and initially prohibited entry, transport, purchase, sale or propagation of all of its varieties, amended its quarantine in 2009 to permit those cultivars when approved or when proven to be interspecific hybrids. The adjacent state of Washington has taken actions that are similar to those of Oregon to bring parity to nursery sales between the two states. Monarch Watch recommends planting only male-sterile "Flutterby" cultivars.

Non-invasive Buddleja cultivars
Vendors have marketed the following "non-invasive" Buddleja cultivars:
Flutterby Petite® Blue Heaven

Lo & Behold® ‘Blue Chip’
Lo & Behold® 'Blue Chip Jr.'
Lo & Behold® ‘Ice Chip’ (formerly ‘White Icing’)
Lo & Behold® ‘Lilac Chip’
Lo & Behold® 'Pink Micro Chip'
Lo & Behold® ‘Purple Haze’ ('Purple Chip')
‘Miss Molly’ ('Red Chip')
‘Miss Ruby’

See also
Index: Buddleja — for Buddleja davidii cultivars.

References

Van Laere K (2008) Interspecific hybridisation in woody ornamentals. PhD. Thesis, Faculty of Bioscience Engineering, Ghent University

Franchet, M.A. (1887). Plantae Davidianae ex sinarum imperio, part 2 "Plantes du Thibet Oriental (Province de Moupine)". (Nouvelles Archives du Museum d'Histoire Naturelle Paris), ser. 2, 10: 33-198.
Li, P. T. & Leeuwenberg, A. J. M. (1996). Loganiaceae, in Wu, Z. & Raven, P. (eds) Flora of China, Vol. 15. Science Press, Beijing, and Missouri Botanical Garden Press, St. Louis, USA.  online at www.efloras.org

External links
 
Floridata: Buddleja davidii
BBC Gardening: Buddleja davidii
Pacific Island Ecosystems at Risk (PIER): Buddleja davidii
USDA PLANTS Profile: Buddleja davidii
RHS Buddleja Trials Report

davidii
Flora of China
Flora of Hubei
Flora of Japan
Butterfly food plants
Garden plants of Asia
Drought-tolerant plants
Taxa named by Adrien René Franchet